Meerufenfushi as a place name may refer to:
 Meerufenfushi (Alif Alif Atoll) (Republic of Maldives)
 Meerufenfushi (Kaafu Atoll) (Republic of Maldives)